"Wondering Where the Lions Are" is a song written and performed by Bruce Cockburn. The track is from his 1979 album Dancing in the Dragon's Jaws.

Chart performance
It was Cockburn's only Top 40 hit in the United States, peaking at No. 21 on the Billboard Hot 100, and it peaked at No. 92 in Australia.

While also a Top 40 hit in Cockburn's native Canada, it was not his biggest hit in that country, where seven of his subsequent singles reached higher chart positions. It was, however, named the 29th greatest Canadian song of all time in the 2005 CBC Radio series 50 Tracks: The Canadian Version.

Personnel
 Bruce Cockburn – guitar, lead vocals
 Pat Godfrey – piano, marimba, backing vocals
 Larry "Sticky Fingers" Silvera – bass, backing vocals http://www.reggaetimes.com/remembering-the-late-larry-professor-bassie-silvera/
 Ben Bow – drums, güiro, backing vocals

Covers 
 Leo Sayer on the 1982 album World Radio.
 Vigilantes of Love on the 2000 compilation album Roaring Lambs.
 Jimmy Buffett on the soundtrack for the 2006 film Hoot
 Donavon Frankenreiter on his 2007 album Recycled Recipes.

References

1979 songs
Bruce Cockburn songs
Songs written by Bruce Cockburn